The Men's double short round paraplegic was an archery competition at the 1984 Summer Paralympics.

The Swiss archer Michel Baudois won the gold medal.

Results

References

1984 Summer Paralympics events